The Prag Mahal is a 19th-century palace located next to the Aina Mahal in Bhuj, Gujarat, India.

History
Prag Mahal is named after Rao Pragmalji II, who commissioned it and construction began in 1865. It was designed by Colonel Henry St Clair Wilkins in what the local tourist office describes as the Italian Gothic style, although it would be better described as a Romanesque architecture twist on the Indo-Saracenic Revival style, and many Italian artisans were involved in its construction. The palace artisans' wages were paid in gold coins. Construction of the palace, which ultimately cost 3.1 million rupees, was completed in 1879 during the regency of Khengarji III (Pragmalji II's son) following Pragmalji II's death in 1875. The local Kutchi builder community (Mistris of Kutch) were also involved in construction of Prag Mahal along with Colonel Wilkins.

Notable features
The palace is made of Italian marble and sandstone from Rajasthan.
The main hall, filled with decaying taxidermy
Durbar hall, with broken chandeliers and classical statues
Corinthian pillars
Jali work depicting European plants and animals
It has 45 foot high tower with a clock, from where you can see the entire Bhuj city.
There is also a small temple in the courtyard behind the palace with nicely carved stonework.

Restoration
The 2001 Gujarat earthquake severely damaged the palace. In 2006, the palace was burgled, with thieves stealing antiques worth millions of rupees and damaging other items throughout the palace.  As of 2007, the palace was in a "ghostly", "forlorn" state. The palace and the tower were later repaired, after Amitabh Bachchan took personal interest in restoration of palace, and its tower and clock have been repaired and are now open for public viewing. The Darbar Hall of the majestic Pragmahal Palace was renovated by the Maharao Pragmalji-III at a personal cost of Rs 5 crore.  Visitors may enter the main palace halls and ascend the bell tower, which offers views of the city.

In popular culture

Scenes from the Bollywood blockbusters Hum Dil De Chuke Sanam and Lagaan, as well as a number of Gujarati films, were shot in the palace.

See also
Aina Mahal
Vijaya Vilas Palace

References

Palaces in Gujarat
Bhuj
Royal residences in India
Rajput architecture
History of Kutch
Tourist attractions in Kutch district
1879 establishments in India
Museums in Gujarat